Kingston is an unincorporated town and census-designated place in Lander County, Nevada, United States. The population of the census-designated place of Kingston was 113 at the 2010 census.

Geography
Kingston is located in southern Lander County on the northeast side of the Toiyabe Range. Bunker Hill, the highest peak in Lander County, is located just a few miles to the northwest.

Demographics

See also
 Kingston Airport (Nevada)

References

Census-designated places in Nevada
Census-designated places in Lander County, Nevada
Unincorporated towns in Nevada